The Backesto Building, or Backesto Block, is a historic structure located at 614 5th Avenue in the Gaslamp Quarter, San Diego, in the U.S. state of California. It was built in 1873 by John Backesto.

See also
 List of Gaslamp Quarter historic buildings

References

External links

 

1873 establishments in California
Buildings and structures completed in 1873
Buildings and structures in San Diego
Gaslamp Quarter, San Diego